Black Madonna is a term used for statues or paintings of the Blessed Virgin Mary in which she is depicted with dark skin

Black Madonna may also refer to:

Religious symbolism
Black Madonna of Częstochowa
Black Madonna Shrine, Missouri
House of the Black Madonna in Prague, Czech Republic

People
The Blessed Madonna, a disc jockey that formerly used the stage name Black Madonna
Black Madonna, a moniker given to artists such as Rihanna and Lil' Kim

Arts
Black Madonna (album), a 2007 album by the Austerity Program
"Black Madonna" (song), a song by Azealia Banks featuring Lex Luger
"Black Madonna", a song by Cage the Elephant from the album Social Cues
Black Madonna (novel), a novel by Carl Sargent and Marc Gascoigne